The Minister charged with the administration of The Crown Corporations Public Review and Accountability Act is a government position in the province of Manitoba, Canada.  It is not a full portfolio, and has always been held by ministers with other cabinet responsibilities.

The current minister is Greg Selinger.

List of Ministers responsible for the Liquor Control Act

Doer was designated as Minister responsible for the Accountability of Crown Corporations.
Gilleshammer was designated as Minister charged with the administration of The Crown Corporations Public Review and Accountability Act.

Crown Corporations Public Review and Accountability Act, Minister charged with the administration of The